Thomas Wright Scott (born May 19, 1948) is an American saxophonist, composer, and arranger. He was a member of The Blues Brothers and led the jazz fusion group L.A. Express.

Early life, family and education
Scott was born in Los Angeles, California, US. He is the son of film and television composer Nathan Scott, who had more than 850 television credits and more than 100 film credits as a composer, orchestrator, and conductor, including the theme songs for Dragnet and Lassie.

Career
Tom Scott's career began as a teenager as leader of the jazz ensemble Neoteric Trio, and the band Men of Note. After that, he worked as a session musician. In 1970, Quincy Jones said of him: "Tom Scott, the saxophonist; he's 21, and out of sight! Plays any idiom you can name, and blows like crazy on half a dozen horns."

Scott wrote the theme songs for the television shows Starsky and Hutch and The Streets of San Francisco. In 1974, with the L.A. Express, he composed the score for the animated movie, The Nine Lives of Fritz the Cat. He played the soprano saxophone solo on the number-one hit single "Listen to What the Man Said" by the band Wings. In 1976, he played the theme "I Still Can't Sleep" in Taxi Driver. Scott also composed the soundtrack for 1980's Stir Crazy. In 1982, he collaborated with Johnny Mathis on "Without Us", the theme to the 1980s sitcom Family Ties. He also played the lyricon, an electronic wind instrument on Michael Jackson's "Billie Jean", as well as lyricon and saxophone on The Grateful Dead's album Terrapin Station.

Scott was a founding member of the Blues Brothers Band, despite his absence in the two films, The Blues Brothers and Blues Brothers 2000. According to Bob Woodward's account in Wired, a biography of John Belushi, Scott left the band after their 1980 tour over a salary dispute. However, he reunited with Dan Aykroyd and the Blues Brothers Band in 1988 to record a few tracks for The Great Outdoors.

Scott led the house band on two short-lived late-night talk shows: The Pat Sajak Show in 1989 and The Chevy Chase Show in 1993. From 1995 to 1998, Scott provided the main title arrangement and additional music for the television series Cybill. He was music director for the 68th Academy Awards in 1996, several Emmy Awards telecasts from 1996 to 2007, Ebony's 50th Birthday Celebration, and the People's Choice Awards telecasts.

He has dozens of solo recordings for which he collected 13 Grammy nominations (three of which he won). He has numerous film and television scoring credits, including composing and conducting the score for the movie Conquest of the Planet of the Apes, and appeared on records by the Beach Boys, Blondie ("Rapture"), Grateful Dead, George Harrison, Whitney Houston ("Saving All My Love for You"), Quincy Jones, Carole King, Richard Marx ("Children of the Night"), Paul McCartney, Joni Mitchell, Eddie Money, Olivia Newton-John, Pink Floyd, Helen Reddy, Frank Sinatra, Steely Dan ("Black Cow"), Steppenwolf, and Rod Stewart ("Da Ya Think I'm Sexy?").

He produced two albums for tenor vocalist Daniel Rodriguez. The Spirit of America has sold over 400,000 copies. Scott is also a member of the Les Deux Love Orchestra and has conducted over 30 symphony orchestras around the U.S. as music director for Rodriguez. His song "Today" is credited as the sample for the hip-hop classic "They Reminisce Over You (T.R.O.Y.)" by Pete Rock & CL Smooth.

Discography

As leader/co-leader 
 The Honeysuckle Breeze (Impulse!, 1967)
 Rural Still Life (Impulse!, 1969)
 Hair to Jazz (Flying Dutchman, 1970)
 Great Scott (A&M, 1972)
 New York Connection (Ode, 1975)
 Blow It Out (Ode, 1977)
 Intimate Strangers (Columbia, 1978)
 Street Beat (Columbia, 1979)
 Apple Juice(Columbia, 1981) – live
 Desire (Elektra/Musician, 1982)
 Target (Atlantic, 1983)
 One Night – One Day (Soundwings, 1986)
 Streamlines (GRP, 1987)
 Flashpoint (GRP, 1988)
 Them Changes with The Pat Sajak Show house band (GRP, 1990)
 Keep This Love Alive (GRP, 1991)
 Born Again (GRP, 1992)
 Reed My Lips (GRP, 1994)
 Night Creatures (GRP, 1995)
 New Found Freedom (Higher Octave, 2002)
 Bebop United (MCG Jazz, 2006) – live
 Telling Stories with Paulette McWilliams (Reviver, 2012)

Soundtracks 
 Paint Your Wagon (Flying Dutchman, 1970)
 Bill Harris, Uptown Saturday Night (Warner Bros., 1975)
 V.A., The Original Soundtrack From The Motion Picture "Stir Crazy" (Posse, 1981)
 Randy Newman, Toy Story 2 (Walt Disney, 1999) – 1 track

As a member 
The L.A. Express
 Tom Scott and The L.A. Express (Ode, 1974)
 Tom Cat (Ode, 1975)
 Bluestreak (GRP, 1996)
 Smokin' Section (Windham Hill, 1999)

The Blues Brothers
 Briefcase Full of Blues (Atlantic 1978)
 Made in America (Atlantic, 1980)
 Best of The Blues Brothers (Atlantic, 1981)
 Dancin' wid da Blues Brothers (Atlantic, 1983)
 Everybody Needs the Blues Brothers (Atlantic, 1988)
 The Very Best of The Blues Brothers (Atlantic, 1995)

The GRP All-Star Big Band
 GRP All-Star Big Band (GRP, 1992)
 Dave Grusin Presents GRP All-Star Big Band Live! (GRP, 1993) – live
 All Blues (GRP, 1995)

As sideman 

With Joan Baez
 Gracias a la Vida (A&M, 1974)
 Diamonds & Rust (A&M, 1975)
 Blowin' Away (Portrait, 1977)

With Glen Campbell
 Rhinestone Cowboy (Capitol, 1975)
 Bloodline (Capitol, 1976)

With The Carpenters
 Now and Then (AM, 1973)
 Passage (AM, 1977)

With Natalie Cole
 Everlasting (Elektra, 1987)
 Good to Be Back (EMI, 1989)

With Christopher Cross
 Another Page (Warner Bros., 1983)
 Back of My Mind (Warner Bros., 1988)

With Neil Diamond
 Tap Root Manuscript (Uni, 1970)
 Beautiful Noise (Columbia, 1976)
 I'm Glad You're Here with Me Tonight (Columbia, 1977)

With Donovan
 Essence to Essence (Epic, 1973)
 Slow Down World (Epic, 1976)

With Don Ellis
 Don Ellis Orchestra 'Live' at Monterey! (Pacific Jazz, 1966)
 Live in 3⅔/4 Time (Pacific Jazz, 1967)
 Pieces of Eight: Live at UCLA (2006) – rec. 1967

With Dan Fogelberg
 Phoenix (Epic, 1979)
 The Innocent Age (Epic, 1981)
 Windows and Walls (Epic, 1984)
 No Resemblance Whatsoever (Giant, 1995)

With George Harrison
 Dark Horse (Apple, 1974)
 Extra Texture (Read All About It) (Apple, 1975)
 Thirty Three & 1/3 (Dark Horse, 1976)
 Somewhere in England (Dark Horse, 1981)

With Richard "Groove" Holmes
 Welcome Home (World Pacific, 1968)
 Six Million Dollar Man (RCA/Flying Dutchman, 1975)

With Rickie Lee Jones
 Rickie Lee Jones (Warner Bros., 1979)
 Pirates (Warner Bros., 1981)

With Carole King
 Fantasy (Ode, 1973)
 Wrap Around Joy (Ode, 1974)
 Thoroughbred (A&M, 1976)
 Simple Things (Capitol, 1977)

With Barry Manilow
 If I Should Love Again (Arista, 1981)
 Swing Street (Arista, 1987)

With Michael McDonald
 If That's What It Takes (Warner Bros., 1982)
 Wide Open (BMG, 2017)

With Joni Mitchell
 For the Roses (Asylum, 1972)
 Court and Spark (Asylum, 1974) – rec. 1973
 Miles of Aisles (Asylum, 1974) – live
 Hejira (Asylum, 1976)

With Eddie Money
 Eddie Money (Columbia, 1977)
 Life for the Taking (Columbia, 1978)

With Oliver Nelson
 Live from Los Angeles (Impulse!, 1967)
 Soulful Brass with Steve Allen (Impulse!, 1968)

With Juice Newton
 Quiet Lies (Capitol, 1982)
 Dirty Looks (Capitol, 1983)
 Old Flame (RCA, 1985)

With Randy Newman
 Born Again (Reprise, 1979)
 Bad Love (DreamWorks, 1999)

With Dolly Parton
 Dolly, Dolly, Dolly (RCA Victor, 1981)
 Heartbreak Express (RCA, 1982)
 Real Love (RCA, 1985)
 Rainbow (CBS, 1987)

With Minnie Riperton
 Adventures in Paradise (Epic, 1975)
 Minnie (Capitol, 1979)
 Love Lives Forever (Capitol, 1980)

With Johnny Rivers
 New Lovers and Old Friends (Epic, 1975)
 Outside Help (Soul City, 1977)

With Howard Roberts
 1968: The Magic Band – Live at Dontes (V.S.O.P., 1995) – live
 1968: The Magic Band II (V.S.O.P., 1998)

With Lalo Schifrin
 Che! (soundtrack) (Tetragrammaton, 1969) – soundtrack
 Rock Requiem (Verve, 1971)

With Boz Scaggs
 Silk Degrees (Columbia, 1976)
 Fade into Light (MVP Japan, 1996)

With Rod Stewart
 Blondes Have More Fun (Warner Bros., 1978)
 Soulbook (J, 2009)

With Barbra Streisand
 ButterFly (Columbia, 1974)
 Wet (Columbia, 1979)
 The Movie Album (Columbia, 2003)

With Gábor Szabó
 Light My Fire with Bob Thiele (Impulse!, 1967)
 Macho (Salvation, 1975)

With Steely Dan
 1976–77: Aja (ABC, 1977)
 1978–80: Gaucho (MCA, 1980)

With Tina Turner
 Tina Turns the Country On! (United Artists, 1974)
 Acid Queen (United Artists, 1975)

With Jimmy Webb
 Words and Music (Reprise, 1970)
 And So: On (Reprise, 1971)

With Paul Williams
 Just an Old Fashioned Love Song (AM, 1971)
 Life Goes On (AM, 1972)
 Here Comes Inspiration (AM, 1974)
 A Little Bit of Love (AM, 1974)

With others
 Joe Byrd and the Field Hippies, The American Metaphysical Circus (Sony, 1969)
 Tim Buckley, Sefronia (Discreet, 1973)
 Victor Feldman, Seven Steps to Heaven (Choice, 1973)
 Robbie Williams, Swings Both Ways (Universal, 2013)
 Tom Waits, The Heart of Saturday Night (Asylum, 1974)
 Eric Carmen, Boats Against the Current (Arista, 1977)
 Lulu, Lulu (Polydor, 1973)
 Alphonse Mouzon, The Man Incognito (Blue Note, 1976) – rec. 1975
 Dalbello, Lisa Dal Bello (MCA, 1977)
 Richie Havens, Mirage (A&M, 1977)
 George Benson, Songs and Stories (Concord, 2009)
 Stephen Bishop, Bish (ABC, 1978)
 Michael Franks, Michael Franks (Brut, 1973)
 Michael Bublé, To Be Loved (Reprise, 2013)
 Peter Allen, Not the Boy Next Door (Arista, 1983)
 Joe Cocker, Hymn for My Soul (EMI, 2007)
 Sara Bareilles, Kaleidoscope Heart (Epic, 2010)
 Josh Groban, Awake (143, 2006)
 Frankie Valli, Frankie Valli... Is the Word (Warner Bros., 1978)
 Kenny Rankin, Professional Dreamer (Private Music, 1995)
 Billy Preston, Music Is My Life (A&M, 1972)
 Aretha Franklin, You (Atlantic, 1975)
 Art Garfunkel, Fate for Breakfast (Columbia, 1979)
 Oleta Adams, Evolution (Fontana, 1993)
 Peggy Lee, Mirrors (A&M, 1975)
 Diane Schuur, Love Songs (GRP, 1993)
 Thelma Houston, I've Got the Music in Me (Sheffield Lab, 1975)
 Bill Plummer, Cosmic Brotherhood (1968)
 Phoebe Snow, Something Real (Elektra, 1989)
 Jaco Pastorius, Word of Mouth (Warner Bros.,  1981)
 Al Jarreau, Breakin' Away (Warner Bros., 1981)
 Richard Marx, Repeat Offender (Capitol, 1989)
 Bernie Taupin, He Who Rides the Tiger (Elektra, 1980)
 Deniece Williams, Hot on the Trail (Columbia, 1986)
 Sarah Vaughan, Brazilian Romance (CBS, 1987)
 Helen Reddy, Music, Music (Capitol, 1976)
 Olivia Newton-John, Soul Kiss (Mercury, 1985)
 Otis Spann, Sweet Giant of the Blues (BluesTime, 1970)
 Ringo Starr, Ringo (Apple, 1973)
 Bob Thiele Emergency, Head Start (Flying Dutchman, 1969)

References

External links
 
 
 
 

American jazz saxophonists
American male saxophonists
Big band bandleaders
Jazz musicians from California
Musicians from Los Angeles
Smooth jazz saxophonists
1948 births
Living people
Grammy Award winners
Impulse! Records artists
Flying Dutchman Records artists
A&M Records artists
Ode Records artists
Columbia Records artists
Elektra Records artists
Atlantic Records artists
GRP Records artists
Windham Hill Records artists
The Blues Brothers members
20th-century saxophonists
21st-century American saxophonists
20th-century American composers
21st-century American composers
American male jazz musicians
GRP All-Star Big Band members
American film score composers
American television composers
American male film score composers
Spiritual jazz musicians